The 1921–22 season was Falco F.C.'s first and only season in the American Soccer League.

Falco F.C. finished last in the league. The club withdrew from the league after the season and the ASL franchise was taken over by Adolph Buslik, owner and manager of Paterson F.C.

American Soccer League

Pld = Matches played; W = Matches won; D = Matches drawn; L = Matches lost; GF = Goals for; GA = Goals against; Pts = Points

National Challenge Cup

Northern Massachusetts and New Hampshire State Cup

Notes and references
Bibliography

Footnotes

Falco F.C.
American Soccer League (1921–1933) seasons
Falco F.C.